This list of the Paleozoic life of Pennsylvania contains the various prehistoric life-forms whose fossilized remains have been reported from within the US state of Pennsylvania and are between 538.8 and 252.17 million years of age.

A

 †Acanthopecten
 †Acanthopecten carboniferous
 †Acidaspis
 †Acidaspis cincinnatiensis
 †Acrothele
 †Acrothele decipiens
 †Acrothele yorkensis
 †Acrotreta
 †Actinomylacris
 †Actinomylacris similis – type locality for species
 †Actinopteria
 †Actinopteria boydi
 †Actinopteria boydii
 †Actinopteria decussata
 †Adelphobolbina
 †Adelphobolbina medialis
 †Adiantites
 †Adiantites mirabilis
 †Adiantites spectabilis – type locality for species
 †Adiantites ungeri – type locality for species
 †Adiatites
 †Adiatites cyclopteroides – type locality for species
 †Adiatites spectabilis – type locality for species
 †Aechmina
 †Agassizocrinus
 †Ageleodus
 †Ageleodus pectinatus
 †Aglaoglypta
 †Aglaoglypta maera
 †Aglaoglypta nactoides
   †Agnostus
 †Alcicornopteris
 †Alcicornopteris altoonensis – type locality for species
 †Alcicornopteris anthracitica – type locality for species
  †Alethopteris
 †Alethopteris densinervosa
 †Alethopteris ingbertensis
 †Alethopteris lonchitifolia
 †Alethopteris missouriensis
 †Alethopteris serli
 †Alethopteris westphalensis
 †Allanella
 †Allanella tullius
 †Alokistocare
 †Alokistocare aoris – type locality for species
 †Alokistocare nasutum – type locality for species
 †Ambocoelia
 †Ambocoelia gregaria
 †Ambocoelia umbonata
 †Amboneura – type locality for genus
 †Amboneura klosei – type locality for species
 †Americaspis
 †Amphiscapha
 †Amphiscapha catilloides
 †Amphissites
 †Anastomopora
 †Ancyrospora
 †Aneurospora
 †Aneurospora greggsii
 †Anisotrypa
 †Ankoura
 †Ankoura apicalis
 †Ankoura orbiculata – or unidentified comparable form
 †Ankoura sublettensis
    †Anomalocaris
 †Anomalocaris lineata
 †Anomomylacris – type locality for genus
 †Anomomylacris cubitalis – type locality for species
 †Anoplea
 †Anoplea nucleata
 †Anoplotheca
 †Anthracospirifer
 †Aparchites
 †Aparchites subrotunda
 †Aphthoroblattina
 †Aphthoroblattina fascigera – type locality for species
 †Aphyllum
 †Aphyllum fascicularium
 †Archaeopteridium
 †Archaeopteridium bellasylviana – type locality for species
  †Archaeopteris
 †Archaeopteris halliana
 †Archaeopteris latifolia
  †Archaeopteris macilenta
 †Archaeopteris minor
 †Archaeopteris roemeriana – or unidentified comparable form
 †Archaeopteris rogersi
 †Archaeosperma
 †Archaeosperma arnoldii
 †Archaeotriletes
 †Archaeotriletes senticosus
 †Archeopteris
 †Archeopteris latifolia
 †Archimylacris
 †Archimylacris parallelum
 †Archinacella
 †Armathyraster
 †Armathyraster paradoxis
 †Arthrophycus
 †Articulatae
  †Asaphiscus
 †Asaphiscus glaber
 †Asemoblatta – type locality for genus
 †Asemoblatta pennsylvanica – type locality for species
 †Astartella
 †Astartella vera
 †Atalotaenia – type locality for genus
 †Atalotaenia adela – type locality for species
 †Ateleocystites
 †Ateleocystites huxleyi
 †Athyris
 †Athyris angelica
 †Athyris spiriferiodes
 †Athyris spiriferoides
 †Atimoblatta – type locality for genus
 †Atimoblatta curvipennis – type locality for species
 †Atimoblatta flexuosa – type locality for species
 †Atimoblatta reducta – type locality for species
 †Atlanticocoelia
 †Atlanticocoelia acutiplicata
 †Atrypa
 †Atrypa recticularis
  †Atrypa reticularis
 †Aulocystis
 †Auroraspora
 †Auroraspora hyalina
 †Auroraspora macra
 †Auroraspora solisorta
 †Auroraspora torquata
  †Aviculopecten
 †Aviculopecten bellus
 †Aviculopecten equilatera
 †Aviculopecten occidentalis

B

 †Bactrites
 †Barbclabornia
 †Barbclabornia luedersensis
 †Barinophyton
 †Barinophyton citrulliforme
 †Barinophyton obscurum
 †Bathyuriscus
 †Batostoma
  †Bellerophon
 †Bellerophon clarki
 †Bellerophon nactus
 †Bembexia
 †Bembexia laevis
 Berenicea
 †Beyrichoceratoides
 †Beyrichoceratoides lunatus
 †Bisporangiostrobus
 †Bisporangiostrobus harrisii
 †Blainia
 †Blainia buttsi – type locality for species
 †Blairella
 †Blairella triangularis – type locality for species
 †Blattoidea
 †Blattoidea schucherti – type locality for species
 †Blountia
 †Blountia prolifica – type locality for species
 †Blountia waddlensis
 †Blountia warriorensis – type locality for species
 †Bollia
 †Bollia hama
 †Bollia hindei
 †Bollia planofibra
 †Bollia spinomuralis
 †Bollia ungula
 †Bolllia
 †Bolllia ungula
 †Bonneterrina
 †Bonneterrina aspinosa – type locality for species
 †Bonnia
 †Bonnia bubaris
 †Bonnia capito
 †Bonnia senecta – tentative report
 †Bonniella
 †Bonniella yorkensis
   †Bothriolepis
 †Bothriolepis nitida
 †Bothriolepis nitidus
 †Brachycycloceras
 †Brachycycloceras curtum
 †Brachymylacris
 †Brachymylacris bassleri – type locality for species
 †Brachymylacris elongata – type locality for species
 †Brachymylacris rotundata – type locality for species
 †Bucanopsis
 †Bufina
 †Bufina bicornuta
 †Burnetiella
 †Burnetiella ectypa
 †Burnetiella urania
 †Buttisia
 †Buttisia drabensis
 †Buttsia
 †Buttsia completa
 †Buttsia drabensis
 †Bynumia
 †Bynumia terrenda
 †Bynumina
 †Bynumina terrenda
 †Bynumina type locality for species – informal
 †Bynuminia
 †Bynuminia terrenda
 †Byronia
 †Byssonychia – tentative report
 †Byssonychia vera – or unidentified comparable form
 Bythocypris

C

 †Calathiops
 †Calathiops pottsvillensis – type locality for species
 †Calathospongia
 †Calathospongia carceralis
 †Calathospongia carlli
 †Calathospongia tidioutensis
  †Callixylon
 †Caloneurella – type locality for genus
 †Caloneurella carbonaria – type locality for species
 †Calvibembexia
 †Calvibembexia sulcomarginata
 †Camaraspis
 †Camaraspis convexa
 †Camarotoechia
 †Camarotoechia constricta
 †Camarotoechia prolifica
 †Camarotoechia saxatilis
 †Camerella
  †Camptostroma
 †Camptostroma roddyi
 †Cardiocarpon
 †Cardiocarpon phillipsi – type locality for species
 †Cariniferella
 †Cariniferella carinata
 †Cariniferella tioga
 †Carydium
 †Carydium bellastriatum
 †Cavellina
 †Cavellina planoprocliva
  †Cavusgnathus
 †Centronella
 †Ceramopora
 †Ceramopora incondita
 †Ceratopsis
 †Ceratopsis chambersi
 †Ceriocrinus
 †Chalepomylacris – type locality for genus
 †Chalepomylacris pulchra – type locality for species
 †Chancelloria
 †Chancelloria yorkensis
 †Chancia
 †Cheilocephalus
 †Cheilocephalus quadratus – type locality for species
 †Chonetes
 †Chonetes buttsi
 †Chonetes hemisphericus
 †Chonetinella
 †Chonetinella verneuilana
 †Cincinnaticrinus
  †Cincinnetina
 †Cincinnetina multisecta
 †Cladopora
 †Cladopora seriata
 †Cleiothyridina
 †Cliffia
 †Cliffia lataegenae
 †Cliffia latagenae
  †Climacograptus
 †Climacograptus typicalis
 †Cobaloblatta – type locality for genus
 †Cobaloblatta simulans – type locality for species
  †Coccosteus
 †Coccosteus macromus – type locality for species
  †Coelacanthus
 †Coleolus
 †Colpodexylon
 †Colpodexylon deatsii
 †Colpomya
 †Colpomya faba
 †Comanchia
 †Comanchia amplooculata
  †Composita
 †Composita subtilita
 †Conaspis
 †Conotheca
 †Conotheca australiensis – or unidentified comparable form
 †Conularia
 †Conularia trentonensis – tentative report
 †Convolutispora
 †Convolutispora opressa – or unidentified comparable form
 †Coosella
 †Coosella convexa – type locality for species
 †Coosella vulgaris – type locality for species
 †Coosia
 †Coosia pustulata – type locality for species
 †Corbulispora
 †Corbulispora cancellata
  †Cordaites
 †Cornellites
 †Cornellites flabella
 †Cornulites
 †Cornulites flexuosus
 †Cornulites progressus – or unidentified comparable form
 †Corticospongia – type locality for genus
 †Corticospongia bradfordensis – type locality for species
 †Cranaena
 †Craniops
 †Craniops hamiltoniae
 †Craniops subtruncata
 †Crenistriella
 †Crenistriella crenistria
 †Crepicephalus
 †Crurithyris
 †Crurithyris planoconvexa
 †Cryptolithus
 †Cryptolithus bellulus
 †Cryptolithus recurvus
 †Cryptozoon
 †Cryptozoon undulatum
 †Ctenerpeton – type locality for genus
 †Ctenerpeton remex – type locality for species
 †Ctenoloculina
 †Ctenoloculina cicatricosa
  †Ctenopterus
 †Ctenopterus cestrotus
 †Cuneamya
 †Cupularostrum
 †Cupularostrum congregata
 †Cupularostrum contracta
 †Cupularostrum exima
 †Cupularostrum orbicularis
 †Cyclonema
  †Cyclopteris
 †Cymatospira
 †Cymatospira montfortianus
 †Cypricardella
 †Cypricardella bellastriata
 †Cypricardella bellistriata
 †Cypricardella tenuistriata
 †Cypricardina
 †Cypricardina indenta
 †Cypricardinia
 †Cypricardinia indenta
 †Cyrtina
 †Cyrtina hamiltonensis
  †Cyrtospirifer
 †Cyrtospirifer disjunctus
 †Cyrtospora
 †Cyrtospora cristifera – or unidentified comparable form
 †Cystihalysites

D

 †Dawsonia
 †Dawsonia parkeri
 †Deadwoodia
 †Deadwoodia duris
 †Dechenella
 †Deckera
 †Deckera completa
 †Dekayella
 †Dellea
 †Dellea glabellamersa
 †Dellea rogersi – type locality for species
 †Dellea saratogensis
 †Delthyris
 †Deltodus
 †Deltodus angularis
 †Densignathus – type locality for genus
 †Densignathus rowei – type locality for species
 †Derbyia
 †Derbyia crassa
 †Derbyia robusta
 †Devonochonetes
 †Devonochonetes coronatus
 †Devonochonetes scitulus
 †Devonochonetes syrtalis
 †Diacanthaspis
 †Diaphanospora
 †Diaphragmus
 †Dictyomylacris
 †Dictyotomaria
 †Dictyotomaria capillaria
 †Dictyotriletes
 †Dictyotriletes nefandus
 †Dieconeurites – type locality for genus
 †Dieconeurites rigidus – type locality for species
  †Diplocaulus – or unidentified comparable form
   †Diploceraspis
 †Diploceraspis burkei
  †Diplograptus
 †Diplograptus nexus
 †Ditomopyge
 †Ditomopyge scitulus
 †Dizygopleura
 †Dodecaactinella
 †Dodecaactinella spicules
 †Dokimocephalus – tentative report
 †Dokimocephalus intermedius
 †Douvillina
 †Douvillina cayuta
 †Douvillina inaequistriata
 †Drabia
 †Drabia acroccipita
 †Drabia acrocclpita
 †Drabia acrocclptia
 †Drabia menusa
 †Drabia typica
 †Dunbarella
 †Dunbarella striata

E

 †Echinoconchus
 †Echinoconchus punctatus
 †Ectenocrinus
 †Ectenocrinus simplex
  †Edaphosaurus
 †Edaphosaurus raymondi – type locality for species
 †Edmondia
  †Eldredgeops
 †Eldredgeops rana
 †Elita
 †Elita fimbriata
  †Elrathia
 †Elrathia grazierensis – type locality for species
 †Elrathina
 †Elvinia
 †Elvinia roemeri
 †Embolophyllum
 †Embolophyllum clarki
 †Embolophyllum coralliferum
 †Embolophyllum schucherti
 †Emmanuella
 †Emmanuella subumbona
 †Emphanisporites
 †Emphanisporites annulatus – or unidentified comparable form
 †Emphanisporites pantagiatus – or unidentified comparable form
 †Emphanisporites rotatus
 †Endolobus
 †Endothyra
 †Endothyranella
 †Endothyranella nitida – or unidentified comparable form
 †Endothyranella stormi – or unidentified comparable form
 †Entellophylloides
 †Entellophylloides inequalils
 †Eoagnostus
 †Eoagnostus roddyi
 †Eoobolus
 †Eoobolus priscus
 †Eoorthis
 †Eoorthis indianola
 †Eoserpeton
 †Eoserpeton tenuicorne – type locality for species
 †Eothele
 †Eothele tubulus
  †Erettopterus
 †Erettopterus globiceps
 †Eryops
 †Eryops avinoffi
 †Eshelmania
 †Esmeraldina
 †Esmeraldina macer
 †Euglyphella
 †Euglyphella numismoides
 †Eukloedenella
 †Eumetria
  †Euomphalus
 †Eupachycrinus
 †Euphemites
 †Euphemites carbonarius

F

 †Fabreciella – type locality for genus
 †Fabreciella pennsylvanica – type locality for species
   †Favosites
 †Favosites niagarensis
 †Fedexia
 †Fenestella
 †Fenestella emaciata
 †Fenestella sinuosa
 †Fimbrispirifer
 †Finkelnburgia
 †Finkelnburgia bridgei – or unidentified comparable form
 †Fistuliporella
 †Fistuliporella minima
 †Fletcherina
 †Fletcherina incognita – or unidentified comparable form
 †Floweria
 †Floweria chemungensis

G

 †Ganorhynchus
 †Ganorhynchus oblongus – type locality for species
 †Geminospora
  †Genevievella
 †Genevievella campbellina – type locality for species
 †Genevievella pennstatensis – type locality for species
 †Genevievella plesiochielus – type locality for species
 †Gigantocharinus – type locality for genus
 †Gigantocharinus szatmaryi – type locality for species
 †Girtya
 †Girtya pennslvanica
 †Girtya pennsylvanica – type locality for species
 †Glabrocingulum
 †Glabrocingulum grayvillense
 †Glaphyraspis
 †Glaphyraspis ovata
 †Glaukerpeton – type locality for genus
 †Glaukerpeton avinoffi – type locality for species
  †Glyptocrinus
 †Glyptodesma
 †Glyptodesma erectum – tentative report
 †Gnathodus
 †Goniomylacris – type locality for genus
 †Goniomylacris pauper – type locality for species
 †Goniophora
 †Goniophora hamiltonensis
 †Grandispora
 †Grandispora cornuta
 †Grandispora upensis
  †Gravicalymene
 †Greenops
 †Greenops boothi

H

 †Hadrotreta
  †Hallipterus
 †Hallipterus lacoanus
 †Hapaloptera – type locality for genus
 †Hapaloptera gracilis – type locality for species
 †Hardieopterus
 †Hardieopterus myops
  †Hazelia
 †Hazelia walcotti
 †Healdia
 †Helcionella
 †Hemimylacrella
 †Hemimylacrella mammothi – type locality for species
 †Hemimylacris
 †Hemimylacris ramificata – type locality for species
 †Herrmannina
 †Heslerodus
 †Heslerodus divergens
 †Hexactinellid
 †Hexactinellid spicules
 †Hibbardella
 †Hibbardia
 †Hibbardia lacrimosa
 †Hindeodus
 †Holcacephalus
 †Holcacephalus tunda
 †Hollinella
 †Hollinella sella – or unidentified comparable form
 †Hollinella tricollina
  †Holonema
 †Holonema horrida – type locality for species
 †Holonema rugosa
 †Holopea
  †Holoptychius
 †Holoptychius americanus
 †Holoptychius filosus – type locality for species
 †Holoptychius giganteus
 †Holoptychus
 †Holoptychus flabellatus – type locality for species
 †Holoptychus latus – type locality for species
 †Holoptychus serrulatus – type locality for species
 †Homacanthus
 †Homacanthus acinaciformis – type locality for species
 †Homilodonta
 †Homilodonta filistriata
 †Hostimella
 †Hostimella crispa
 †Housia
 †Housia vacuna
 †Hudsonaster
 †Hudsonaster lancolatus – or unidentified comparable form
  †Hughmilleria
 †Hughmilleria shawangunk
 †Hymenocaris
 †Hymenozonotriletes
 †Hymenozonotriletes explanatus
 †Hymenozonotriletes granulatus
  †Hynerpeton – type locality for genus
 †Hynerpeton bassetti – type locality for species
 †Hyolithellus
 †Hyolithellus micans
 †Hyolithes
 †Hyolithes wanneri
 †Hyolithid
 †Hypselentoma
 †Hypselentoma perhumerosa
 †Hystricosporites
 †Hystricosporites multifurcatus
 †Hystricosporites porcatus
 †Hystriculina
 †Hystriculina wabashensis

I

 †Ianthinopsis
 †Iddingsia
 †Iddingsia anatina
 †Idiomylacris – type locality for genus
 †Idiomylacris gracilis – type locality for species
 †Imlerella
 †Imlerella praecipita – type locality for species
 †Indiana – tentative report
 †Inflatia
 †Inocaulis
  †Iocrinus
 †Iocrinus subcrassus
 †Irvingella
 †Irvingella major
  †Isodectes
 †Isodectes obtusus – type locality for species
  †Isotelus
 †Isotelus gigas
 †Ithycephalus

K

 †Katabuporhynchus
 †Katabuporhynchus mesacostalis
  †Kiaeropterus
 †Kiaeropterus otisius
 †Kindbladia
 †Kindbladia wichitaensis
 †Kingstonia
 †Kingstonia apion
 †Kingstonia ara
 †Kingstonia cheilusis – type locality for species
 †Kingstonia trapezoidia – type locality for species
 †Kingstonia ulrichi – type locality for species
 †Kingstonia walcotti
 †Kinklidoblatta
 †Kinklidoblatta lesquereuxi – type locality for species
 †Kinocera – tentative report
 †Kinzercystis
 †Kinzercystis durhami
 †Kinzeria – type locality for genus
 †Kinzeria crinita – type locality for species
 †Kladognathus
 †Kloedinia
 †Knoxisporites
 †Knoxisporites dedaleus
 †Kochiella
  †Kootenia
 †Kootenia marcoui
 †Kraeuselisporites
  †Kutorgina
 †Kutorgina cingulata
 †Kutorgina edsoni
 †Kyphocephalus

L

 

 

 †Lacoea
 †Lacoea seriata – type locality for species
 †Lagenospermum
 †Lagenospermum imparirameum
 †Lambdagnathus
 †Lancastria
 †Lecanospira
 †Lecanospira compacta
 †Lecanospira salteri – or unidentified comparable form
 †Leiorhynchus
 †Leiozonotriletes
 †Lepdidodendropsis
 †Leperditia
 †Lepidocystis
 †Lepidocystis wanneri
 †Lepidodendropsis
 †Lepidodendropsis scobiniformis
 †Lepidodendropsis stigillariodes
 †Lepidodendropsis stigillaroides
 †Lepidodendropsis vandergrachti
 †Lepidostrobus
 †Lepidostrobus gallowayi
 †Leptaena
 †Leptaena rhomboidalis
 †Leptaena richmondensis – or unidentified comparable form
 †Leptodesma
 †Leptodesma cadmus
 †Leptodesma extenuatum
 †Leptodesma hector
 †Leptodesma laevis
 †Leptodesma lichas
 †Leptodesma maclurii
 †Leptodesma mortoni
 †Leptodesma naviforme
 †Leptodesma nereus
 †Leptodesma nitida
 †Leptodesma orus
 †Leptodesma patulum
 †Leptodesma pelops
 †Leptodesma phaon
 †Leptodesma sayi
 †Leptodesma sociale
 †Leptodesma spinerigum
 †Leptomitus
 †Lichenocrinus
 Lingula
 †Lingula carbonaria
 †Lingula delia
 †Lingula ligea
  †Lingulella
 †Lingulella marcia – or unidentified comparable form
 †Lingulepis
 †Lingulepis acuminata
 †Linoproductus
 †Linoproductus cora
 †Liospira
 †Liospira americana
 †Llanoaspidella – type locality for genus
 †Llanoaspidella bigenusia – type locality for species
 †Llanoaspidella warriorsmarkensis – type locality for species
 †Llanoaspis – tentative report
 †Lonchocephalus
 †Lonchocephalus planus – type locality for species
 †Lonchocephalus swartzi – type locality for species
 †Lonchocephalus waddlei – type locality for species
 †Longispina
 †Longispina mucronatus
 †Lophophyllidium
 †Lophophyllidium profundum
 †Lophospira
 †Lophozonotriletes
 †Lophozonotriletes excisus
 †Lophozonotriletes tuberosus
 †Loxonema
   †Lysorophus
 †Lysorophus dunkardensis

M

 †Macluritella – tentative report
 †Macluritella multiseptarius
 †Maeneceras
 †Maeneceras milleri
  †Margaretia
 †Mariopteris
 †Martinia
 †Mediospirifer
 †Mediospirifer audaculus
 †Mediospirifer belliplicata
 †Mediospirifer bellitropis
 †Mediospirifer dromgoldi
 †Megakozlowskiella
 †Megakozlowskiella sculptilis
  †Megalograptus – tentative report
 †Megamolgophis
 †Megamolgophis agostinii
 †Megastrophia
 †Menomonia
 †Menomonia calymenoides
 †Mesitoblatta
 †Mesitoblatta emersoni – type locality for species
 †Mesotaphraspis
  †Metacoceras
 †Metacoceras cornutum
 †Metaxyblatta – type locality for genus
 †Metaxyblatta hadroptera – type locality for species
 †Metropator – type locality for genus
 †Metropator pusillus – type locality for species
 †Michelinoceras
 †Micromitra
 †Micromitra alabamensis
 †Mimagoniatites – tentative report
 †Modiella
 †Modiella pygmaea
 †Modiolopsis
 †Modiomorpha
 †Modiomorpha concentrica
 †Modocia
 †Modocia benorensis – type locality for species
 †Monotrypa
 †Monotrypa benjamini
    †Mucrospirifer
 †Mucrospirifer mucronatus
 †Mylacridae
 †Mylacridae carbonina
 †Mylacris
 †Mylacris angusta – type locality for species
 †Mylacris anthracophila – type locality for species
 †Mylacris dubia – type locality for species
 †Mylacris lucifuga – type locality for species
 †Mylacris ovalis – type locality for species
 †Mylacris pennsylvanica – type locality for species
 †Mylacris truncatula – type locality for species

N

 †Nalivkinella
 †Nalivkinella echoense
 †Nanahughmilleria
 †Nanahughmilleria clarkei
 †Naticonema
  †Naticopsis
 †Necymylacris
 †Necymylacris heros – type locality for species
 †Necymylacris lacoana – type locality for species
 †Neoblairella – type locality for genus
 †Neoblairella crassimarginata – type locality for species
 †Neochonetes
 †Neochonetes granulifer
 †Neomylacris
 †Neomylacris major – type locality for species
 †Neomylacris pulla – type locality for species
 †Neoprionodus
 †Neoraistrickia
 †Neosimplicius – type locality for genus
 †Neosimplicius medialis – type locality for species
  †Neospirifer
 †Neospirifer cameratus
 †Neriopteris
 †Neriopteris lanceolata
 †Nervostrophia
 †Nervostrophia nervosa
  †Neuropteris
 †Nisusia
 †Nisusia festinata
  Nucula
 †Nucula bellistriata
 †Nucula lirata
 Nuculana
 †Nuculites
 †Nuculites oblongatus
 †Nuculites planulatus
 †Nuculites triqueter
 †Nuculopsis
 †Nuculopsis girtyi

O

 †Octonaria
 †Octonaria bifurcata
 †Octonaria dicristata
 †Octonaria quadricostata
  †Ogygopsis
 †Ogygopsis klotzi
 †Olenellus
 †Olenellus alius
 †Olenellus similaris
 †Olenellus wanneri
  †Olenoides
 †Olenoides buttsi – type locality for species
 †Olenoides pennsylvanicus – type locality for species
 †Olenoides serratus
 †Olethroblatta
 †Olethroblatta americana – type locality for species
 †Orbiculoidea
 †Orbiculoidea tullia
 †Orsadesmus – type locality for genus
 †Orsadesmus rubecollus – type locality for species
  †Orthacanthus
 †Orthacanthus compressus
 †Orthacanthus platypternus
 †Orthacanthus texensis
  †Orthoceras
 †Orthograptus
 †Orthograptus quadrimucronatus
 †Orthomylacris
 †Orthomylacris alutacea – type locality for species
 †Orthomylacris analis – type locality for species
 †Orthomylacris cordiformis – type locality for species
 †Orthomylacris mansfieldi – type locality for species
 †Orthomylacris pauperata – type locality for species
 †Orthomylacris pennsylvaniae – type locality for species
 †Orthomylacris pittstoniana – type locality for species
 †Orthomylacris pluteus – type locality for species
 †Orthonota
 †Orthonota parvula – tentative report
 †Orthonota undulata
 †Orthonychia
 †Orthonychia parva
 †Orthotetes
 †Orthotheca
 †Orthotheca shriveri – type locality for species
 †Oryctocephalus
  †Osteolepis
 †Oulodus
 †Ovatia
 †Oxynoblatta
 †Oxynoblatta vicina – type locality for species
 †Ozarkodina

P

 †Paedeumias
 †Paedeumias eboracense
 †Paedeumias glabrum
 †Paedeumias yorkense
  †Pagetia
 †Paladin
 †Palaeoneilo
 †Palaeoneilo constricta
 †Palaeoneilo fecunda
 †Palaeoneilo muta
 †Palaeoneilo oweni
 †Palaeoneilo plana
 †Palaeoneilo tenuistriata
 †Palaeotherates
 †Palaeotherates pennsylvanicus – type locality for species
 †Palaeozygopleura
 †Palaeozygopleura delphicola
 †Panenka
 †Parabolbina
 †Parabolbina cardocornella
 †Parabolbina obliqua
 †Parabolinella
 †Parabolinella occidentalis
 †Parabolinoides
 †Paracyclas
 †Paracyclas lirata
 †Parahaplophlebium
 †Parahaplophlebium longipenne – type locality for species
  †Parahughmilleria
 †Parahughmilleria maria
 †Parajuresania
 †Parajuresania nebrascensis
 †Parallelodon
 †Parallelodon obsoletus
 †Paranacystites
   †Paraspirifer
 †Paraspirifer acuminatus
 †Parvohallopora
 †Parvohallopora dalei – or unidentified comparable form
 †Paterina
 †Paterina bella
  †Pelagiella
 †Pemphigaspis
 †Pemphigaspis bullata
 †Pemphigaspis intermedia – type locality for species
 †Pemphigaspis matutina
 †Penniretepora
  †Pentremites
 †Periomella
 †Periomella roddyi
 †Periomella yorkensis
  †Peronopsis
  †Petalodus
 †Petalodus ohioensis
 †Petrocrania
     †Phacops
 †Pharkidonotus
 †Pharkidonotus percarinatus
 †Phestia
 †Philhedra
 †Philhedra laelia – or unidentified comparable form
 †Phoberoblatta – type locality for genus
 †Phoberoblatta grandis – type locality for species
 †Phoberoblatta reticulata – type locality for species
 †Pholidops
 †Pholidostrophia
 †Pholidostrophia pennsylvanica
 †Phragmactis
 †Phricodothyris
 †Phthinomylacris
 †Phthinomylacris medialis – type locality for species
 †Phthinomylacris pauper – type locality for species
 †Phthonia
 †Phthonia sectifrons
 †Phyloblatta
 †Phyloblatta indecisa – type locality for species
 †Phyloblatta prior – type locality for species
 †Pinctus
 †Pinctus latus
 Pinna
 †Pionoceras
 †Pionoceras swartzi
 †Plagioblatta
 †Plagioblatta campbelli – type locality for species
 †Plagioblatta cockerelli – type locality for species
 †Plagioglypta
 †Plagioglypta meekiana
 †Planoendothyra – tentative report
 †Planoendothyra associata
 †Planutenia
 †Planutenia flectata
 †Plasiochiton – type locality for genus
 †Plasiochiton curiosus – type locality for species
   †Platyceras
 †Platyceras euomphaloides
 †Platyceras lineatum
 †Platylichas
 †Plectorthis
 †Plectorthis plicatella
  †Pleurodictyum
 †Pleurodictyum styloporum
 †Polidevcia
 †Polidevcia bellistriata
 †Poliella
 †Poliella bala
 †Polypora
 †Ponderodictya
 †Ponderodictya favulosa
 †Ponderodictya punctulifera
 †Poroblattina
 †Poroblattina parvula – type locality for species
 †Praewaagenoconcha
 †Praewaagenoconcha speciosa
 †Primitiella
 †Primitiella unicornis
 †Prismopora
 †Productella
 †Productella rectispina
 †Productus
  †Proetus
 †Proetus haldemani – tentative report
 †Proetus parviusculus
 †Prolepidodendron
 †Prolepidodendron breviinternodium
 †Promopalaeaster
 †Promopalaeaster bellulus
 †Promopalaeaster pricei
 †Promytilus
 †Protobarinophyton
 †Protobarinophyton pennsylvanicum
  †Protocaris
 †Protocycloceras
 †Protocycloceras rushense
 †Protoleptostrophia
 †Protoleptostrophia perplana
 †Protomya – or unidentified comparable form
 †Protospongia – tentative report
 †Prozacanthoides
 †Pseudoatrypa
 †Pseudoatrypa devoniana
 †Pseudolingula
 †Pseudolingula rectilateralis
 †Pseudopaolia
 †Pseudopaolia lacoana – type locality for species
 †Pseudopolyernus
 †Pseudopolyernus laminarum – type locality for species
 †Pseudosaratogia
 †Pseudosaratogia bulbosa
 †Pseudosaratogia lata – tentative report
 †Pseudosaratogia magna
 †Pseudotealliocaris
 †Pseudotealliocaris palincsari
 †Pteridomylacris – type locality for genus
 †Pteridomylacris paradoxa – type locality for species
 †Pterinea
 †Pterinopecten
 †Pterinopecten hermes
 †Pterinopecten princeps
 †Pterochaenia
 †Pterygometopus
 †Pterygometopus achates
 †Ptilograptus
 †Ptilomylacris – type locality for genus
 †Ptilomylacris medialis – type locality for species
 †Ptilopora
 †Ptomatis
 †Ptychoglyptus
 †Ptychoglyptus virginensis – or unidentified comparable form
 †Ptychoparella
 †Ptychoparella lancastra
 †Ptychopteria
 †Ptychopteria chemungensis
 †Ptychopteria flabella
 †Ptychopteria salamanca
 †Ptylopora
 †Pugnax
 †Pugnax pugnus
 †Pustula
 †Pustula pertenuis
 †Pustulatia
 †Pustulatia pustulosa

Q

 †Quasillites

R

 †Rafinesquina
 †Rafinesquina alternata
 †Retichonetes
 †Retichonetes marylandicus
 †Retichonetes vicinus
 †Retispira
 †Retispira marcouianus
 †Retusotriletes
 †Retusotriletes phillipsii
 †Rhacophyton
 †Rhacopteris
 †Rhinidictya
  †Rhinocarcinosoma
 †Rhinocarcinosoma cicerops
 †Rhipidomella
 †Rhipidomella leucosia
 †Rhipidomella penelope
 †Rhipidomella vanuxemi
  †Rhodea
 †Rhodea alleghanensis – type locality for species
 †Rhodea tionestana – type locality for species
 †Rhodea vespertina – type locality for species
 †Rhombopora
 †Rhytimya
 †Rhytimya radiata
 †Ribeiria
 †Ribeiria parva – or unidentified comparable form
 †Roddyia
 †Rodea (genus)
 †Rodea vespertina – type locality for species
 †Ruedemannipterus
 †Ruedemannipterus stylonuroides
 †Rugospora
 †Rugospora flexuosa

S

  †Salterella
 †Salterella acervulosa
 †Salterella conulata
 †Salterella mccullochi
 †Salterella pulchella
 †Sanguinolites
 †Sapphicorhynchus
 †Sapphicorhynchus sappho
 †Saratogia
 †Saratogia type locality for species – informal
  †Sauripterus
 †Sauripterus taylori
 †Schaefferia (Paleozoic plant) – or unidentified comparable form
 †Schizoblatta
 †Schizoblatta pennsylvanica – type locality for species
 †Schizodiscus
 †Schizodiscus capsa
 †Schizodus
 †Schizodus cuneatus
 †Schizophoria
 †Schizophoria amanaensis
 †Schizophoria impressa
 †Schizophoria striatula
 †Schuchertella
 †Schuchertella parva
 †Schuchertella variabilis
 †Schuchertia
 †Schuchertia laxata
  †Sciadophyton
 †Secarisporites
  †Selkirkia
 †Septopora
 †Serracaris
 †Shansiella
 †Shansiella carbonaria
   †Sidneyia
   †Sigillaria
 †Sinochonetes
 †Sinochonetes lepidus
 †Sinuites
 †Sinuites cancellatus
 †Soleniscus
 †Soleniscus primogenia
 †Soleniscus typicus
 †Solenochilus
 †Solenochilus collectum
 †Solenopleurella
 †Solenopleurella elatifrons – type locality for species
 †Solenopleurella transversa – type locality for species
 †Solutotherates
 †Solutotherates analis – type locality for species
 †Sowerbyella
 †Sowerbyella plicatellus
 †Sowerbyella rugosa
 †Spathognathodus
 †Spelaeotriletes
 †Spelaeotriletes crustalus
 †Spelaeotriletes resolutus
 †Sphenomylacris
 †Sphenomylacris singularis – type locality for species
 †Spinatrypa
 †Spinatrypa hystrix
 †Spinatrypa spinosa
 †Spinocyrtia
 †Spinocyrtia girtyi
 †Spinocyrtia granulosa
 †Spinocyrtia macbridei
 †Spinulicosta
 †Spinulicosta spinulicosta
  †Spirifer
 †Spirifer disjunctus
 †Spirifer varicosa
 †Spongophylloides
 †Spyroceras
 †Spyroceras nuntium
 †Stauromatidium
 †Stauromatidium marylandicum
 †Stemtonoceras
 †Stemtonoceras elongatum
 †Stenomylacris – type locality for genus
 †Stenomylacris elegans – type locality for species
 †Stereolasma
 †Stittaspis
 †Stittaspis loria – type locality for species
 †Straparollus
 †Striacoceras
 †Striacoceras typum – tentative report
 †Strobeus
 †Strobeus paludinaeformis
 †Strophalosia
 †Strophalosia truncata
 †Stropheodonta
 †Stropheodonta demissa
  †Strophomena
 †Styliolina
 †Styliolina bellistriata
 †Styliolina fissurella
 †Subrensselandia
 †Subrensselandia claypolii
 †Sulcocephalus
 †Sulcocephalus candidus
 †Sulcocephalus granulosus
 †Sulcoretepora
 †Sulcoretepora incisurata
 †Sulcoretepora sinuosa – or unidentified comparable form
 †Swataria – type locality for genus
 †Swataria derstleri – type locality for species
 †Syntrophina
 †Syscioblatta
 †Syscioblatta allegheniensis – type locality for species
 †Syscioblatta pennsylvanica – type locality for species

T

 †Tabulipora
 †Taeniaster
 †Taeniaster maximus
 †Taenicephalus
 †Taenicephalus shumardi
  †Taeniocrada
 †Taeniopora
 †Taeniopora exigua
 †Taonurus
 †Tellinopsis
 †Temnocheilus
 †Temnocheilus crassus
 †Tentaculites
 †Tentaculites attenuatus
 †Tetradella
 †Tetradella multipustulosa
  †Tetraxylopteris
 †Thlipsura
 †Thlipsura ultimata
 †Thlipsurella
 †Thlipsurella semipunctata
 †Titanodictya
 †Titanodictya jucunda – type locality for species
 †Titusvillia – type locality for genus
 †Titusvillia drakei – type locality for species
 †Trepospira
 †Trepospira illinoisensis
  †Triarthrus
 †Triarthrus becki
  †Tricrepicephalus
 †Tricrepicephalus arcuatus – type locality for species
 †Trimerus
 †Trimerus dekayi
 †Triphyllopteris
 †Triphyllopteris biloba – type locality for species
 †Triphyllopteris latilobata – type locality for species
 †Triphyllopteris latilobatus
 †Triphyllopteris lescuriana
 †Trocophyllum
 †Trocophyllum breviinternodium
 †Tropidoleptus
 †Tropidoleptus carinatus
 †Truncalosia
 †Truncalosia truncata
 †Truncatiramus – now regarded as a jr. synonym of Erettopterus
 †Tryplasma
 †Tubulella
 †Tuzoia
 †Tylothyris
 †Tylothyris mesacostalis
 †Tylothyris pauliformis

U

 †Ulrichia
 †Ulrichia elongata
 †Ulrichia spinifera
  †Urasterella
 †Urasterella pulchella

V

 †Vallatisporites
 †Vallatisporites pusilites
 †Vernonaspis
 †Verrucosisporites
 †Verrucosisporites nitidus
 †Verrucosisporites scurrus
 †Vinella

W

  †Wanneria
 †Wanneria walcottana
 †Warrenella
 †Warrenella laevis
 †Welleraspis
 †Welleraspis newfoundlandensis – or unidentified comparable form
 †Whidbornella
 †Whidbornella lachrymosa
 †Wilkingia
 †Wilkingia terminale
 †Worthenia
 †Worthenia tabulata

X

 †Xenoblatta
 †Xenoblatta pennsylvanica – type locality for species
 †Xenocheilos
 †Xenocheilos spineum

Y

  †Yochelcionella
 †Yochelcionella americana – type locality for species
 †Yochelcionella chinensis
 †Yochelcionella greenlandica
 †Yorkia
 †Yorkia wanneri

Z

 †Zaphrenthis
 †Zelophyllia
 †Zelophyllum
 †Zygospira

References

 

Paleozoic
Pennsylvania